Mycena albidocapillaris is a species of mushroom in the family Mycenaceae that is found in Australia. It was first described scientifically in 1933 by mycologist John Burton Cleland, who named it Mycena subcapillaris. The type collection was made in 1922 on Mount Lofty. It was later discovered that the name was invalid, as Paul Hennings use of that name in 1899 took precedence. Cheryl Grgurinovic and Tom May republished the species with the new replacement name Mycena albidocapillaris in 1997.

The gills on the cap underside are few and rather distantly spaced. The fungus fruits in groups on leaves, twigs and stigs, and decaying fern fronds.

References

External links

albidocapillaris
Fungi described in 1997
Fungi native to Australia
Taxa named by Tom May (mycologist)
Taxa named by Cheryl A. Grgurinovic